Budsabong Yimploy (born 17 January 1947) is a Thai sprinter. She competed in the women's 4 × 100 metres relay at the 1964 Summer Olympics.

References

External links
 

1947 births
Living people
Athletes (track and field) at the 1964 Summer Olympics
Budsabong Yimploy
Budsabong Yimploy
Place of birth missing (living people)
Olympic female sprinters
Budsabong Yimploy